Carl Vilhelm "Kalle-Knubb" Josefsson (September 1, 1895 – November 3, 1974) was a Swedish ice hockey player who competed in the 1924 Winter Olympics.

In 1924, he was a member of the Swedish ice hockey team which finished fourth in the Olympic ice hockey tournament. He played two matches as goaltender.

External links

1895 births
1974 deaths
Ice hockey players at the 1924 Winter Olympics
Olympic ice hockey players of Sweden
Swedish ice hockey goaltenders